The Serpents Trail, also known as the Trail of the Serpents and the Serpentine Trail, is a trail within the Colorado National Monument in Mesa County, Colorado, United States, that is listed on the National Register of Historic Places.

Description

The trail was built by the visionary John Otto, who began the campaign to establish the national monument. Otto began his survey in 1911 with the help of civil engineer J.F. Sleeper. Otto's grand plan was to link Grand Junction to Moab, Utah by a scenic road to be part of a transcontinental road system. Construction began in 1912 and continued sporadically to 1921, when Mesa County took the project over. Engineer J.B. Claybaugh completed the project in 1924.

The construction of the Rim Rock Drive destroyed portions of the Serpents Trail. A  portion has been preserved as a hiking trail. During the 1930s the Park Service considered upgrading the trail to a higher standard of road, but dropped the project. Only the relatively gentle upper section of the trail was incorporated into Rim Rock Drive in 1939–40.

The trail was added to the National Register of Historic Places April 21, 1994

See also

 National Register of Historic Places listings in Colorado National Monument
 National Register of Historic Places listings in Mesa County, Colorado

References

External links

 
  at the National Park Service's NRHP database

Park buildings and structures on the National Register of Historic Places in Colorado
National Register of Historic Places in Colorado National Monument
Transportation in Mesa County, Colorado
Hiking trails in Colorado
Protected areas of Mesa County, Colorado
Historic American Engineering Record in Colorado
1921 establishments in Colorado